Glenopteris is a genus of moths of the family Erebidae. The genus was erected by Jacob Hübner in 1821.

Species
Glenopteris herbidalis Guenée, 1854 Brazil
Glenopteris oculifera Hübner, [1821] Suriname
Glenopteris ornata (Schaus, 1911) Costa Rica

References

External links

Calpinae
Taxa named by Jacob Hübner